This is a list of railway lines in France, belonging either to the national network (SNCF Réseau) or to private owners.

High speed lines (LGV, managed by the SNCF) 

 Under Construction
 Contournement Nîmes – Montpellier
 Turin–Lyon high-speed railway
 Projected
 LGV Bordeaux–Toulouse
 LGV Poitiers–Limoges
 LGV Provence-Alpes-Côte d'Azur
 Proposed
 
 LGV Montpellier–Perpignan
 LGV Normandie
 LGV Picardie

Interregional lines (SNCF)

Radial lines
Centered on Paris, from the north and clockwise:
Paris–Lille railway
Creil–Jeumont railway (toward Brussels)
La Plaine–Hirson (via Soissons and Laon)
Paris–Strasbourg railway (via Épernay and Nancy)
Paris–Mulhouse railway (via Troyes and Vesoul)
Paris–Marseille railway (via Dijon and Lyon)
Moret–Lyon railway (via Nevers, Roanne and Saint-Étienne)
Orléans–Montauban railway (via Limoges)
Paris–Bordeaux railway (via Orléans and Tours)
Paris–Brest railway (via Le Mans and Rennes)
Mantes-la-Jolie–Cherbourg railway (via Caen)
Paris–Le Havre railway (via Rouen)
Épinay-Villetaneuse–Le Tréport-Mers railway (via Persan-Beaumont and Beauvais)

International lines
Fives–Mouscron railway (Belgium, via Roubaix)
Fives–Tournai railway (Belgium, via Baisieux)
Douai–Quiévrain (Belgium, via Valenciennes)
Hautmont–Mons railway (Belgium, via Feignies)
Metz–Luxembourg railway (via Zoufftgen)
Metz–Überherrn (Germany, freight only, abandoned between Metz and Anzeling)
Rémilly–Saarbrücken railway (Germany)
Appenweier–Strasbourg railway (Germany, via Kehl)
Mulhouse–Müllheim (Germany)
Strasbourg–Basel railway (Switzerland, via Mulhouse)
Besançon–Le Locle-Col-des-Roches (Switzerland, via Morteau)
Frasne–Les Verrières (Switzerland, via Pontarlier)
Dijon–Vallorbe (Switzerland, via Dole and Frasne)
Lyon–Geneva railway (Switzerland, via Ambérieu and Bellegarde)
Annemasse–Geneva railway (Switzerland, partly under construction)
Longeray-Léaz–Le Bouveret (Switzerland, via Annemasse and Évian)
Turin–Modane railway (Italy, via Fréjus Rail Tunnel)
Cuneo–Ventimiglia (Italy, via Tende and Breil-sur-Roya)
Marseille–Ventimiglia railway (Italy, via Toulon and Nice)
Narbonne–Portbou railway (Spain)
Portet-Saint-Simon–Puigcerdà railway (Spain, via Pamiers and Foix)
Pau–Canfranc railway (abandoned beyond Bedous)
Bordeaux–Irun railway (Spain, via Dax and Bayonne)

Abandoned:
Mont Cenis Pass Railway (Italy, via the Mont Cenis Pass prior to the Fréjus Rail Tunnel)

Other interregional lines

Northern France
Amagne-Lucquy–Revigny (freight only, abandoned beyond Challerange)
Amiens–Rouen railway
Fives–Hirson (via Valenciennes and Aulnoye)
Hirson–Amagne-Lucquy (abandoned beyond Liart)
Longueau–Boulogne railway
Mohon–Thionville
Pierrelaye–Creil
Reims–Laon railway
Saint-Denis–Dieppe railway (abandoned beyond Gisors)
Saint-Just-en-Chaussée–Douai (via Montdidier, Péronne and Cambrai, partly abandoned)
Soissons–Givet (via Reims and Charleville-Mézières, Soissons-Bazoches abandoned)
Trilport–Bazoches

Eastern France
Andelot-en-Montagne–La Cluse (via Champagnole, Saint-Claude and Oyonnax)
Berthelming–Sarreguemines
Blainville-Damelevières–Lure (via Épinal)
Bologne–Pagny-sur-Meuse (via Neufchâteau, partly abandoned)
Culmont-Chalindrey–Toul (via Neufchâteau)
Coolus–Sens (via Troyes, freight only, partly abandoned)
Le Coteau–Montchanin (via Paray-le-Monial, partly abandoned)
Dijon–Saint-Amour (via Louhans)
Gretz-Armainvilliers–Sézanne (abandoned beyond La Ferté-Gaucher)
Haguenau–Hargarten-Falck (partly abandoned)
Is-sur-Tille–Culmont-Chalindrey
Longueville–Esternay (abandoned beyond Villiers-Saint-Georges)
Mâcon–Ambérieu (via Bourg-en-Bresse)
Mommenheim–Sarreguemines
Mouchard–Bourg-en-Bresse (via Lons-le-Saunier)
Moulins–Mâcon (abandoned beyond Paray-le-Monial)
Paray-le-Monial–Givors (via Lozanne and Tassin)
Saint-Hilaire-au-Temple–Hagondange (via Sainte-Menehould and Verdun)
Strasbourg–Saint-Dié (via Molsheim)
Villeneuve-Saint-Georges–Montargis (abandoned beyond Malesherbes)

Abandoned:
Jessains–Sorcy
Lutzelbourg–Drulingen
Mézy–Romilly-sur-Seine
Montargis–Sens
Saint-Julien (Troyes)–Saint-Florentin-Vergigny

Southern France
Agen–Vic-en-Bigorre railway (freight only, abandoned beyond Auch)
Béziers-Neussargues (ligne des Causses, via Millau)
Bordeaux–Sète railway (via Montauban, Toulouse and Narbonne)
Bourges–Miécaze (abandoned beyond Montluçon)
Brive-la-Gaillarde–Toulouse railway (via Figeac and Gaillac)
Clermont-Ferrand–Saint-Just-sur-Loire
Coutras–Tulle (via Périgueux)
Eygurande-Merlines–Clermont-Ferrand
Givors–Grezan (Grezan = Nîmes, right Rhône bank)
Limoges–Périgueux
Livron–Aspres-sur-Buëch
Lyon–Marseille (via Grenoble and Aix-en-Provence)
Montluçon–Saint-Sulpice-Laurière (via Guéret)
Morcenx–Bagnères-de-Bigorre (via Mont-de-Marsan and Tarbes)
Port-Sainte-Marie–Riscle (freight only, abandoned beyond Condom)
Saint-Georges-d'Aurac–Saint-Étienne (via Le Puy en Velay)
Saint-Germain-des-Fossés–Nîmes (Ligne des Cévennes, via Gannat, Clermont-Ferrand and Alès)
Souillac–Viescamp-sous-Jallès
Tarascon–Sète (via Nîmes and Montpellier)
Toulouse–Bayonne railway (via Pau)

Western France
Brétigny–La Membrolle-sur-Choisille (via Dourdan and Vendôme)
Chartres–Bordeaux (via Saumur, Niort and Saintes, partly abandoned)
Châteaubriant–Rennes
Évreux–Quetteville (via Pont-Audemer, freight only, abandoned between Évreux and Glos-Montfort)
Limoges-Bénédictins–Angoulême
Lison–Lamballe railway (via Saint-Lô, Dol-de-Bretagne and Dinan)
Le Mans–Angers railway
Le Mans–Mézidon (via Alençon)
Mignaloux-Nouaillé–Bersac (abandoned beyond Le Dorat)
Nantes–Saintes (via La Rochelle)
Paris–Chartres (via Gallardon, abandoned between Paris and Gallardon)
Rennes–Redon railway
Les Sables-d'Olonne–Tours (via Bressuire and Chinon, partly abandoned)
Saint-Benoît–Le Blanc (abandoned beyond Jardres)
Saint-Cyr–Surdon (part of Paris–Granville connection)
Savenay–Landerneau railway (via Redon, Vannes and Quimper)
Tours–Le Mans railway
Tours–Saint-Nazaire railway
 
Abandoned:
La Chapelle-Anthenaise–Flers

Regional lines (SNCF)

Alsace 
Colmar–Metzeral
Lutterbach–Kruth (via Cernay)
Sélestat–Saverne (abandoned beyond Molsheim)
Strasbourg–Lauterbourg
Vendenheim–Wissembourg
Abandoned:
Bouxwiller–Ingwiller
Steinbourg–Obermodern

Aquitaine 
Bayonne–Saint-Jean-Pied-de-Port railway
Dax–Mont-de-Marsan (freight only, partly abandoned)
Lamothe–Arcachon
Libourne–Le Buisson (via Bergerac)
Niversac–Agen
Puyoô–Dax
Ravezies–Pointe-de-Grave
Saint-Sever–Hagetmau
Siorac-en-Périgord–Cazoulès (abandoned beyond Sarlat-la-Canéda)

Abandoned:
Marmande–Mont-de-Marsan
Nérac–Mont-de-Marsan
Penne-d'Agenais–Tonneins

Auvergne 
–Gannat
Montluçon–Moulins (abandoned beyond )
Bort-les-Orgues–Neussargues (partly abandoned)
La Ferté-Hauterive–Gannat (partly abandoned)
Figeac–Arvant (via Aurillac)
Laqueuille–Le Mont-Dore
Saint-Germain-des-Fossés–Darsac (partly abandoned)
Souillac–Viescamp-sous-Jallès (abandoned between Souillac and Saint-Denis-près-Martel)
Vichy–Riom

Abandoned:
Lapeyrouse–Volvic

Basse-Normandie 
Argentan–Granville (via Flers)
Lisieux–Trouville-Deauville
Mézidon–Trouville-Deauville railway (abandoned between Mézidon and Dives-Cabourg)
Pont-l'Évêque–Honfleur (freight only, abandoned between Pont-l'Évêque and Quetteville)
Saint-Lô–Guilberville (freight only, abandoned beyond Condé-sur-Vire)

Bourgogne 
Clamecy–Nevers (freight only, partly abandoned)
Cravant-Bazarnes–Dracy-St-Loup (via Avallon and Saulieu)
Clamecy–Gilly-sur-Loire (abandoned beyond Cercy-la-Tour)
Dijon–Is-sur-Tille
Étang–Santenay (via Autun, abandoned beyond Dracy-Saint-Loup)
Laroche–Migennes–Cosne (via Auxerre and Clamecy, abandoned beyond Entrains)
Maison-Dieu–Les Laumes (freight only, abandoned Maison-Dieu and Époisses)
Nevers–Chagny (via Le Creusot)
Tamnay-Châtillon–Château-Chinon (freight only)

Bretagne 
Auray–Quiberon railway
Auray–Pontivy (freight only)
Guingamp–Carhaix railway
Guingamp–Paimpol railway
Morlaix–Roscoff
Plouaret–Lannion railway
Quimper–Pont-l'Abbé (freight only, abandoned beyond Pluguffan)
Rennes–Saint-Malo railway
Rosporden–Concarneau (freight only, abandoned beyond Coat-Conq)
Saint-Brieuc–Pontivy (freight only, abandoned beyond Loudéac)

Abandoned:
Miniac-Morvan–La Gouesnière-Cancale-St-Méloir
Ploërmel–La Brohinière
Saint-Brieuc–Le Légué
Vitré–Pontorson

Centre 
Auxy-Juranville–Bourges (freight only, abandoned between Auxy-Juranville and Les Bordes, and beyond Argent-sur-Sauldre)
Le Blanc–Argent-sur-Sauldre railway (metric railway, abandoned between Le Blanc and Buzançais, and beyond Salbris)
Chartres–Dreux (freight only)
Chartres–Orléans (freight only)
Gien–Argent (freight only, abandoned beyond Poilly-lez-Gien)
Orléans–Gien (freight only, abandoned beyond Les Bordes)
Pont-de-Braye–Blois (freight only, partly abandoned)
Tours–Châteauroux (freight only beyond Loches)
Vierzon–Saincaize (via Bourges)
Vierzon–Saint-Pierre-des-Corps
Villefranche-sur-Cher–Blois (freight only, abandoned beyond Romorantin-Lanthenay)

Abandoned:
Orléans–Montargis
Saint-Germain-du-Puy–Cosne-Cours-sur-Loire

Champagne-Ardenne 
Blesme-Haussignémont–Chaumont (via Saint-Dizier)
Châlons-en-Champagne–Reims
Charleville–Hirson (abandoned beyond Tournes)
Épernay–Reims
Liart–Tournes
Oiry–Romilly-sur-Seine (freight only, abandoned beyond Sézanne)

Abandoned:
Fère-Champenoise–Vitry-le-François
Saint-Dizier–Doulevant-le-Château

Franche-Comté 
Dole–Belfort (via Besançon)
Franois–Arc-et-Senans (part of connection Besançon–Bourg-en-Bresse)
Montbozon–Lure (freight only, abandoned between Montbozon and Villersexel)
Voujeaucourt–Saint-Hippolyte (freight only, abandoned beyond Pont-de-Roide)

Abandoned:
Besançon–Vesoul

Haute-Normandie 
Bréauté-Beuzeville–Fécamp
Bréauté-Beuzeville–Gravenchon–Port-Jérôme (freight only)
Le Havre-Graville–Tourville-les-Ifs (abandoned beyond Rolleville)
Malaunay–Dieppe
Montérolier-Buchy–Motteville (freight only)
Motteville–Saint-Valéry-en-Caux
Rouxmesnil–Eu (freight only, abandoned beyond Bailly-en-Rivière)
Serquigny–Oissel

Abandoned:
Montérolier-Buchy–Saint-Saëns railway

Île-de-France 
Chemin de fer de Petite Ceinture
Grande Ceinture line
Achères–Pontoise
Aulnay-sous-Bois–Aéroport Charles de Gaulle (Ligne de Roissy)
Corbeil-Essonnes–Montereau
Ermont-Eaubonne–Valmondois
Esbly–Crécy-la-Chapelle
Flamboin-Gouaix–Montereau (freight only)
Grigny–Corbeil-Essonnes
Montsoult-Maffliers–Luzarches
Plaisir-Grignon–Épône-Mézières
Paris–Versailles-Rive-Gauche (Ligne des Invalides)
Paris-Saint-Lazare–Ermont-Eaubonne
Paris–Mantes-Station (via Conflans-Sainte-Honorine)
Paris–Versailles-Rive-Droite (via Saint-Cloud)
Paris–Saint-Germain-en-Laye
La Plaine–Ermont-Eaubonne
Saint-Cloud–Saint-Nom-la-Bretèche

Languedoc-Roussillon 
Bessèges–Robiac
Carcassonne–Rivesaltes (via Limoux, abandoned between Quillan and Axat)
Elne–Arles-sur-Tech (freight only, abandoned beyond Le Boulou)
Le Monastier–La Bastide-Saint-Laurent-les-Bains (via Mende)
Narbonne–Bize (freight only)
Perpignan–Villefranche-de-Conflent
Saint-Césaire–Le Grau-du-Roi
Le Teil–Alès (abandoned between Le Teil and Robiac)
Villefranche-de-Conflent–Latour-de-Carol (Ligne de Cerdagne, metre gauge railway)

Abandoned:
Colombiers–Quarante-Cruzy
Paulhan–Montpellier

Limousin 
Busseau-sur-Creuse–Ussel (via Aubusson, abandoned between Felletin and La Courtine)
Le Dorat–Limoges
Nexon–Brive-la-Gaillarde (via Saint-Yrieix)Not in use between St Yrieix and Objat
Le Palais–Eygurande-Merlines (via Ussel)
Tulle–Meymac
Vieilleville–Bourganeuf (freight only)

Lorraine 
Arches–Saint-Dié railway
Épinal–Bussang (abandoned beyond Remiremont)
Frouard–Novéant
Jarville-la-Malgrange–Mirecourt
Lérouville–Metz
Longuyon–Mont-Saint-Martin (via Longwy)
Longuyon–Pagny-sur-Moselle
Lunéville–Saint-Dié
Merrey–Hymont-Mattaincourt (via Vittel)
Neufchâteau–Épinal (abandoned between Gironcourt and Mirecourt, and beyond Hymont)
Réding–Metz
Thionville–Anzeling
Thionville–Apach
Toul–Rosières-aux-Salines (freight only, abandoned between Toul and Chaligny)

Abandoned:
Bettelainville–Waldwisse
Fontoy–Audun-le-Tiche

Midi-Pyrénées 
Capdenac–Rodez
Castelnaudary–Rodez (via Castres and Albi, abandoned between Revel and La Crémade, and between Castres and Ranteil)
Castelsarrasin–Beaumont-de-Lomagne (freight only)
Castres–Bédarieux (abandoned beyond Mazamet)
Lannemezan–Arreau-Cadéac (freight only)
Montauban–La Crémade (abandoned between Montauban and Saint-Sulpice)
Montréjeau–Luchon
Sévérac-le-Château–Rodez
Tessonnières–Albi
Toulouse–Auch

Nord-Pas-de-Calais 
Arras–Dunkirk railway
Arras–Saint-Pol-sur-Ternoise
Boulogne–Calais railway
Busigny–Somain (via Cambrai)
Coudekerque-Branche–Fontinettes railway (Dunkerque–Calais)
Ferrière-la-Grande–Cousolre (freight only)
Fives–Abbeville (via Béthune, abandoned beyond Saint-Pol-sur-Ternoise)
La Madeleine–Comines-France
Lens–Don - Sainghin railway
Lens–Ostricourt
Lille–Fontinettes railway (Lille–Calais via Armentières and Saint-Omer)
Lourches–Valenciennes
Saint-Pol-sur-Ternoise–Étaples

Pays de la Loire 
Clisson–Cholet
Commequiers–St-Gilles-Croix-de-Vie
Nantes–La Roche-sur-Yon (via Sainte-Pazanne and Challans, abandoned beyond Commequiers)
La Possonnière–Niort (abandoned beyond Cholet)
Sainte-Pazanne–Pornic
Saint-Hilaire-de-Chaléons–Paimbœuf (freight only)
Saint-Nazaire–Le Croisic

Abandoned:
La Flèche–Vivy
Nantes–Châteaubriant

Picardie 
Abbeville–Eu
Amiens–Laon (via Tergnier)
Creil–Beauvais
Ormoy-Villers–Boves (freight only between Ormoy-Villers and Ageux, abandoned between Ageux and Estrées-Saint-Denis)
Rochy-Condé–Soissons (via Clermont-de-l'Oise, Estrées-Saint-Denis and Compiègne, mostly abandoned)

Abandoned:
Beauvais-Amiens
Feuquières–Ponthoile
Saint-Omer-en-Chaussée–Vers

Poitou-Charentes 
Beillant–Angoulême (via Cognac)
Saint-Benoît–La Rochelle (via Niort)
Saintes–Royan

Provence-Alpes-Côte d'Azur 
Avignon–Miramas (via Cavaillon and Salon-de-Provence)
Cannes-la Bocca–Grasse
Carnoules–Gardanne (abandoned between Brignoles and Peynier)
Miramas–l'Estaque (via Martigues)
Nice–Breil-sur-Roya
La Pauline-Hyères–Les Salins-d'Hyères (abandoned beyond Hyères)
Rognac–Aix-en-Provence (freight only)
Veynes–Briançon (via Gap)

Abandoned:
Les Arcs–Draguignan
Marseille-Blancarde–Marseille-Prado
Saint-Auban–Digne

Rhône-Alpes 
Aix-les-Bains-Le Revard–Annemasse (via Annecy and La Roche-sur-Foron)
Ligne du Haut-Bugey (Bourg-en-Bresse–Bellegarde)
Collonges-Fort-l'Écluse – Divonne-les-Bains (freight only, abandoned beyond Gex)
Le Coteau–Saint-Germain-au-Mont-d'Or (Roanne-Lyon)
Culoz–Modane railway (via Chambéry)
Grenoble–Montmélian railway
Lyon-Croix-Rousse–Trévoux (partly abandoned)
Lyon-Saint-Clair–Bourg-en-Bresse
Lyon-Saint-Paul–Montbrison (abandoned beyond Sainte-Foy-l'Argentière)
La Roche-sur-Foron–Saint-Gervais-les-Bains-Le Fayet
Saint-André-le-Gaz–Chambéry
Saint-Gervais–Vallorcine railway (via Chamonix, metric railway)
Saint-Pierre-d'Albigny–Bourg-Saint-Maurice (Tarentaise)
Saint-Rambert-d'Albon–Rives (partly abandoned)
Valence–Moirans railway

Lines not belonging to the National network

Corsica 
 Chemins de fer de la Corse:
Bastia–Ajaccio
Ponte-Leccia–Calvi
Calvi-L'Île-Rousse

Provence-Alpes-Côte d'Azur 
 Nice–Digne

Lines of the RATP 
 Ligne de Sceaux (southern branch of the RER B)

Touristic lines 
 Chemin de Fer de la Baie de Somme
 Chemin de Fer de La Mure
 Chemin de Fer du Blanc-Argent
 Chemin de fer du Montenvers
 Chemin de fer du Vivarais
 Chemin de fer forestier d'Abreschville
 Chemin de fer Froissy-Dompierre
 Chemin de Fer Touristique du Tarn
 Petit train d'Artouste
 Petit train de la Rhune
 Tramway du Cap-Ferret
 Tramway du Mont-Blanc
 Tramway de Pithiviers à Toury

Abandoned lines

Western France 
Chemin de fer du Finistère
Chemin de fer des Côtes-du-Nord
Chemins de fer armoricains
Chemins de fer du Morbihan
 Île de Ré
 Réseau Breton
 Réseau Guerlédan
Tramways d'Ille-et-Vilaine
Tramways électriques du Finistère

Northern France
 Chemin de fer d'Anvin à Calais
 Chemin de fer de Boulogne à Bonningues
 Chemin de fer du Cambrésis
 Chemins de fer d'Aire à Fruges et de Rimeux-Gournay à Berck 
 Réseau Albert
 Réseau des Bains de Mer
 Tramway à vapeur d'Ardres à Pont d'Ardres
 Somain–Halluin railway (via Orchies, Ascq and Tourcoing)

See also
 Réseau Ferré de France
 Réseau Express Régional
 SNCF

Lines

France